2002–03 was the fourth season that Division 1 functioned as the third-level of ice hockey in Sweden, below the second-level Allsvenskan and the top-level Elitserien (now the SHL).

Format 
The league was divided into four regional groups. In each region, the top teams qualified for the Kvalserien till Allsvenskan, for the opportunity to be promoted to the Allsvenskan. The bottom teams in each group were forced to play in a relegation round against the top teams from Division 2 in order to retain their spot in Division 1 for the following season. These were also conducted within each region.

Season

Northern region

First round

Group A

Group B

Allettan

Qualification round

Group A

Group B

Playoffs

First round 
 Malå IF - Asplöven HC 3:5/0:5
 Bräcke IK - Östersunds IK 0:6/1:4

Second round 
 Östersunds IK - Asplöven HC 3:5/1:4

Relegation

Group A 
 The Brooklyn Tigers and Kalix HF qualified for the league.

Group B

Western region

First round

Group A

Group B

Allettan

Qualification round

Group A

Group B

Final round

Group A

Group B

Relegation

Group A

Group B

Eastern region

First round

Group A

Group B

Allettan

Qualification round

Final round

Relegation

Southern region

First round

Final round

Group A

Group B

Relegation

Group A

Group B

External links 
 Season on hockeyarchives.info

3
Swedish Division I seasons